Micmac, Micmacs or Mic Mac can refer to:

Mi'kmaq people
 Mi'kmaq people, Native people of the Southeastern Woodlands of Canada
Mi'kmaq language
Mi'kmaq hieroglyphic writing

Places in Canada
 Lake Micmac near Halifax, Nova Scotia
Micmac ParClo, partial cloverleaf at Lake Micmac, formerly Micmac Rotary
 Mic Mac Mall in Dartmouth, Nova Scotia
 Mic Mac AAC, Amateur Aquatic Club in Dartmouth, Nova Scotia
 Mic Mac Park in Windsor, Ontario

Other
 Micmacs (film), a 2009 French film
 Chatham MicMacs, former name of the Chatham Maroons Canadian junior ice hockey team
 HMCS Micmac (R10), former Canadian destroyer
 Neoseiulus micmac, a species of mite
 MicMac online, former name of MMPORG Asda Story
 Micmac Air Services, operating company of Conne River Water Aerodrome in Newfoundland, Canada
 Micmac, a now defunct series of fashion shops founded by playboy Gunter Sachs
 Micmac War (or Anglo-Micmac War), more obscurely referred to as "Father Le Loutre's War"
 MicMac (software), an open-source photogrammetry suite

See also
Mi'kmaq (disambiguation)

Language and nationality disambiguation pages